Joseph R. Stowell (born December 24, 1926) is an American former college basketball coach and broadcaster. After attending Bradley University and playing on the basketball team from 1947–50, he returned as an assistant coach in 1956 and became Bradley's ninth head coach in 1965. During his thirteen seasons as Bradley's head coach he won 197 games.  He was fired as head coach in 1978.  His basketball resume also features two seasons coaching high school boys and two years coaching the Bradley University women.  In 1985 Stowell joined Dave Snell as a WMBD (AM) broadcaster for Bradley basketball games, and worked in that position until 2010.

References

1926 births
Living people
American men's basketball coaches
American men's basketball players
American radio sports announcers
American women's basketball coaches
Basketball coaches from Illinois
Basketball players from Illinois
Bradley Braves men's basketball coaches
Bradley Braves men's basketball players
Bradley Braves women's basketball coaches
High school basketball coaches in the United States
Radio personalities from Illinois
Sportspeople from Peoria, Illinois
Place of birth missing (living people)